Elizabeth Township may refer to one of the following townships in the United States:

 Elizabeth Township, Jo Daviess County, Illinois
 Elizabeth Township, Otter Tail County, Minnesota
 Elizabeth Township, Lawrence County, Ohio
 Elizabeth Township, Miami County, Ohio
 Elizabeth Township, New Jersey
 Elizabeth Township, Allegheny County, Pennsylvania
 Elizabeth Township, Lancaster County, Pennsylvania

Township name disambiguation pages